Thomas Shaw, 1st Baron Craigmyle  (23 May 1850 – 28 June 1937), known as The Lord Shaw from 1909 to 1929, was a Scottish radical Liberal Party politician and judge.

Life
The son of Alexander Shaw of Dunfermline, Fife, Craigmyle was educated at the Dunfermline High School and at Edinburgh University. He was appointed an advocate in 1875 and became a Queen's Counsel in 1894. He gained an LLD from St Andrews University in October 1902 and from the University of Aberdeen in 1906 and was also Hamilton Fellow in Mental Philosophy at Edinburgh University.

Craigmyle sat as Member of Parliament (MP) for Hawick Burghs from 1892 to 1909 and served as Solicitor General for Scotland from 1894 to 1895 and as Lord Advocate from December 1905 to 1909. He resigned from parliament and ministerial office and was created a life peer as Baron Shaw, of Dunfermline in the County of Fife, on 20 February 1909, so that he could sit in the House of Lords and serve as a Lord of Appeal in Ordinary. He retired from this office in 1929 and was made an hereditary peer as Baron Craigmyle, of Craigmyle in the County of Aberdeen, on 7 Mar 1929.

Lord Craigmyle married Elspeth, daughter of George Forrest, in 1879. He died in June 1937, aged 87, and was succeeded in the hereditary barony by his son Alexander. Lady Craigmyle died in 1939.

Arms

Notes

References 
Kidd, Charles, Williamson, David (editors). Debrett's Peerage and Baronetage (1990 edition). New York: St Martin's Press, 1990,

External links
 

 

Alumni of the University of Aberdeen
Alumni of the University of St Andrews
20th-century Scottish judges
19th-century King's Counsel
Shaw, Thomas
Members of the Faculty of Advocates
Lord Advocates
Law lords
Barons in the Peerage of the United Kingdom
1850 births
1937 deaths
Shaw, Thomas
Shaw, Thomas
Shaw, Thomas
Shaw, Thomas
Shaw, Thomas
UK MPs who were granted peerages
Members of the Judicial Committee of the Privy Council
People educated at Dunfermline High School
Scottish King's Counsel
Solicitors General for Scotland
Members of the Privy Council of the United Kingdom
19th-century Scottish lawyers
Peers created by Edward VII
Barons created by George V